O. S. Thiagarajan (born 3 April 1947) is a Carnatic Musician based in Chennai. He is the son and disciple of Sangeetha Booshanam O.V.Subrahmanyam. He learnt music from Sangeetha Kalanidhi T. M. Thiagarajan, while Padmabhushan Lalgudi Jayaraman provided guidance/mentorship early in his career. An ‘A-Top’ graded artist of the All India Radio and of Doordarshan, he has been giving a large number of concerts, and is considered one of the eminent artists of his generation. He is regularly featured by all leading sabhas in Chennai as well as throughout India and has been accompanied by top accompanists such as Lalgudi Shri.G.Jayaraman, M.S. Gopalakrishnan, V.V. Subrahmanyam on violin, Palghat Mani Iyer, Dr T.K.Murthy, Palghat Raghu, Karaikudi Mani, Trichy Sankaran, Umayalpuram Sivaraman on mridanagm, Shri.G Harishankar on Kanjira and Vikku Vinayakaram on Ghatam. He has toured many countries, including USA, Canada, Australia, Singapore, Middle East, Malaysia, Hong Kong, South Africa, and many cities in Europe. He worked as Dean and Faculty of Fine Arts at Annamalai University for 5 years. He has trained many disciples who are active on the concert circuit.

Awards and honours

 Sangeetha Natak Academi Puraskar (Sangeetha Natak Academi)
 Sangeetha Choodamani (Sri Krishna Gana Sabha, Chennai)
 Sangeetha Kala Sagara (Kalasagaram, Hyderabad)
 Nada Gana Kala Praveena (Sangeetha Samraj, Madurai)
 Nadha Booshanam (Shanmukananda Sangeetha Sabha, New Delhi)
 Vani kala sudakara (Vani Mahal)
 GNB award (Indian Fine Arts)
 Kalasironmani (Chennai cultural academy)

Discography

Controversies
As a part of what was widely considered as India's #MeToo movement, singer Chinmayi who had earlier accused Vairamuthu of sexually harassing her, posted on her Twitter account, accounts of women who accused Thyagarajan of molestation and sexual harassment. Another detailed account of alleged harassment was published by a NRI Carnatic music student. Owing to this, the Madras Music Academy cancelled his concert and of the other accused artistes during Annual December 2018 series and the next year also.

See also
 List of Carnatic singers

References

External links
 Article title
 https://web.archive.org/web/20150621170233/http://www.carnaticdarbar.com/interviews/2010/OS-Thyagarajan.asp
 http://www.lokvani.com/lokvani/article.php?article_id=9297

1947 births
Living people
Male Carnatic singers
Carnatic singers
20th-century Indian male classical singers
Sanskrit-language singers
21st-century Indian male classical singers
Recipients of the Sangeet Natak Akademi Award